"I'm in Love with a Capital "U"" is a song recorded by American country music artist Joe Diffie.  It was released in May 1995 as the fourth single from the album Third Rock from the Sun.  The song reached #21 on the Billboard Hot Country Singles & Tracks chart.  The song was written by Paul Nelson and Craig Wiseman.

Chart performance

References

1995 singles
1994 songs
Joe Diffie songs
Songs written by Paul Nelson (songwriter)
Songs written by Craig Wiseman
Epic Records singles